Scopula albidaria is a moth of the  family Geometridae. It is found in Central Asia.

Subspecies
Scopula albidaria albidaria
Scopula albidaria sankana Prout, 1938 (Tian-Shan)

References

Moths described in 1901
albidaria
Moths of Asia